"Sooner or Later" is a song recorded by American guitarist, singer-songwriter and music producer Larry Graham. The song, written and produced by Larry Graham, was released in 1982 by Warner Bros. Records. The song is included in his album of the same name.

"Sooner or Later" was moderately successful, peaking number 17 on the Billboard  Dance chart and number 27 on the R&B chart in 1982. The single even crossed over to British pop chart, reaching number 54.

Reception
In July 1982, the song was included in the Billboard Top Single Picks, recommended section, stating "Graham's recent success as a balladeer hasn't buried his roots in hearty black pop, as evidenced by this infectious exercise in smooth funk. Synthesizer, hand-claps and Graham's sly bass syncopations keep the pace while the singer still adds enough of a croon to his delivery to keep female listeners swooning".

Track listing

1982 releases 
12" vinyl
 US: Warner Bros. / PRO-A-1046

12" vinyl
 UK: Warner Bros. / K17925T

Personnel 
Composer, producer, arrangement: Larry Graham
Executive Producer: Ron Nadel

Chart performance

References 

1982 singles
1982 songs
Larry Graham songs
Warner Records singles